Qaralar (also, Karalar) is a village and municipality in the Tovuz Rayon of Azerbaijan.  It has a population of 254.

References 

Populated places in Tovuz District